The 2022 United States state treasurer elections were held on November 8, 2022, to elect the state treasurer and equivalents in twenty-seven states, plus a special election in Utah. The previous elections for this group of states took place in 2018. The treasurer of Vermont serves two-year terms and was last elected in 2020.

These elections took place concurrently with several other federal, state, and local elections.

Partisan composition
Going into the election, there were 22 Republican state treasurers and 20 Democratic treasurers. This class of treasurers were made of 14 Democrats and 14 Republicans.

Democrats defended two states won by Donald Trump, and Republicans defended one state won by Joe Biden in 2020. Additionally,  Democrats held state treasurer offices in three states with Republican governors, while Republicans did not hold any state treasurer offices in states with Democratic governors.

Race summary

States

Closest races 
States where the margin of victory was under 5%:
 Nevada, 1%
 Wisconsin, 1.48%
 Iowa, 2.8%

States where the margin of victory was under 10%:
 New Mexico, 6.3%
 Delaware, 7.28%
 Connecticut, 7.47%
 Rhode Island, 8.82%

Blue denotes races won by Democrats. Red denotes races won by Republicans.

Alabama

Incumbent Republican Young Boozer, who was appointed to the position October 1, 2021 after the previous treasurer, John McMillan, resigned, ran for election to a full term. Boozer previously served as Alabama State Treasurer from 2011 to 2019. He won the general election in a landslide. 

Boozer won his primary on May 24. He easily won the general election.

Arizona

Incumbent Republican Kimberly Yee initially ran for governor, but suspended her campaign on January 15, 2022, and instead ran for re-election. State representative Jeff Weninger challenged Yee in the Republican primary, as did former Arizona Republican Party treasurer Bob Lettieri.

The only Democratic candidate was state senator Martín Quezada.

Lee and Quezada won their respective primaries on August 2, 2022.

Ye easily won re-election.

Arkansas

Incumbent Republican Dennis Milligan was term-limited and cannot seek a third term.

Republican candidates included State senator Mathew Pitsch and state representative Mark Lowery. The only Democratic candidate is Pam Whitaker.

Lowery and Whitaker won their respective primaries on May 24.

Lowery won the general election in a landslide.

California

Incumbent Democrat Fiona Ma won re-election, defeating Republican councilmember and economist Jack M. Guerrero.

Ma and Guerrero advanced from the nonpartisan blanket primary on June 7.

Colorado

Incumbent Democrat Dave Young won re-election, defeating Republican Lang Sias, former state representative and Republican nominee for lieutenant governor in 2018. 

Young and Sias won their respective primaries on June 28.

Connecticut

Incumbent Democrat Shawn Wooden is retiring. Democratic candidates included investment firm COO Dita Bhargava, Connecticut State Board of Education chairwoman Karen DuBois-Walton, and former vice chair of the Democratic Party of Connecticut Erick Russell.

State representative Harry Arora ran unopposed in the Republican primary.

Russell won the Democratic primary on August 9.

Delaware

Incumbent Democrat Colleen Davis is running for re-election. Republican Greg Coverdale is running against her.

Florida

Incumbent Republican Jimmy Patronis is running for re-election.

The only Democratic candidate is former state representative Adam Hattersley.

Idaho

Incumbent Republican Julie Ellsworth ran for re-election. Her only challenger was Democrat Jill L. Ellsworth.

Both Ellsworths won their respective primaries on May 17.

In June, Jill Ellsworth withdrew from the Democratic nomination and was replaced by Deborah Silver on the ballot.

Illinois

Incumbent Democrat Mike Frerichs is running for re-election. House deputy minority leader Tom Demmer is running against him, as is high school assistant Patrice McDermand.

Frerichs and Demmer won their respective primaries on June 28.

Indiana

Incumbent Republican Kelly Mitchell is term-limited and cannot seek a third term.

Republican candidates included Morgan County Republican party chair Daniel Elliott, Fort Wayne city clerk Lana Keesling, Boone County council president Elise Nieshalla, and former Indiana Republican Party spokesman Pete Seat.

The only Democratic candidate is Jessica McClellan, the Monroe County treasurer.

Elliott and McClellan won their party conventions on June 18.

Iowa

Incumbent Democrat Michael Fitzgerald is running for re-election. Republican state senator Roby Smith is challenging Fitzgerald.

Fitzgerald and Smith won their respective primaries on June 7.

Kansas

Incumbent Democrat Lynn Rogers was appointed January 2, 2021, after his predecessor, Jake LaTurner, resigned when he was elected to Congress. Rogers is running for election to a full term.

Republican candidates included state representative Steven Johnson and state senator Caryn Tyson.

A recount was triggered in the Republican race due to a 1% margin between the two candidates. 17 days later, Tyson conceded the race after the recount showed Johnson in the lead.

Massachusetts

Incumbent Democrat Deb Goldberg is running for re-election, and is being challenged by Libertarian Cristina Crawford.

Nebraska

Incumbent Republican John Murante is running for re-election. He faced a primary challenge from Paul Anderson. Libertarian Katrina Tomsen is also running.

Murante won his primary on May 10.

Nevada

Incumbent Democrat Zach Conine is running for re-election.

Republican candidates included business owner Manny Kess and member of the Las Vegas city council Michele Fiore. Bryan Elliott is running as a Libertarian, while Margaret Hendrickson is running as the candidate of the Independent American Party.

Conine and Fiore won their respective primaries on June 14.

New Mexico

Incumbent Democrat Tim Eichenberg is term-limited and cannot seek a third term. Democratic candidates included former judge Heather Benavidez and former Sandoval County treasurer Laura Montoya. Harry Montoya ran unopposed in the Republican primary.

Both Montoyas won their respective primaries on June 7.

New York

The duties of treasurer have been carried out by the New York State Comptroller since the office of New York State Treasurer was abolished in 1926. Incumbent Democrat Thomas DiNapoli is running for re-election. He faced a primary challenge from Quanda Francis, the president of Sykes Capital Management. The only Republican candidate is former Wall Street analyst and financial adviser Paul Rodriguez.

DiNapoli and Rodriguez won their respective primaries on June 28.

Ohio

Incumbent Republican Robert Sprague is running for re-election. Democratic mayor of Marion Scott Schertzer is running against him.

Sprague and Schertzer won their respective primaries on May 3.

Oklahoma

Incumbent Republican Randy McDaniel is retiring. Republican candidates included Oklahoma County county clerk David B. Hooten, former chairman of the Oklahoma Tax Commission Clark Jolley, and state representative Todd Russ.

The only Democratic candidate is Charles De Coune, who ran for treasurer in 2018 as an independent. Gregory J. Sadler is running as a Libertarian.

Russ won his runoff on August 23, while de Coune won his primary on June 28.

Rhode Island

Incumbent Democrat Seth Magaziner is term-limited and cannot seek a third term. Democratic candidates included former Central Falls mayor James Diossa and Rhode Island Commerce Secretary Stefan Pryor.

The only Republican candidate is North Kingstown finance director James Lathrop.

South Carolina

Incumbent Republican Curtis Loftis is running for re-election. His only opponent is Sarah E. Work, a member of the Alliance Party.

Loftis won his primary on June 14.

South Dakota

Incumbent Republican Josh Haeder is running for re-election.

Haeder won the nomination at the Republican state convention on June 25.

John Cunningham is the Democratic nominee.

Texas

The duties of treasurer have been carried out by the Texas Comptroller of Public Accounts since the office of Texas State Treasurer was abolished in 1996. Incumbent Republican Glenn Hegar ran for re-election.

Democratic candidates included Certified Public Accountant Janet Dudding, attorney Tim Mahoney and author Angel Luis Vega.

Hegar won his primary on March 1, while Dudding won her runoff on May 24.

Hegar easily won re-election.

Utah (special)

Incumbent Republican Marlo Oaks was appointed June 29, 2021, after his predecessor, David Damschen, resigned. He is running in the special election. He will be challenged by Libertarian Joseph Buchman, Independent American Warren Rogers, and United Utah Thomas Horne.

Oaks won his primary on June 28.

Vermont

Incumbent Democrat Beth Pearce is retired.

The only Democratic candidate was former commissioner of the Vermont Department of Financial Regulation Mike Pieciak, while the only Republican candidate was perennial candidate H. Brooke Paige. Paige dropped out of the race on August 19. However, the party's executive committee could not find another candidate in time, and Paige continued as the Republican nominee. Don Schramm ran as the candidate of the Vermont Progressive Party.

Pieciak won the general election.

Wisconsin

Incumbent Democratic Party Treasurer Sarah Godlewski chose not to seek re-election, instead unsuccessfully running for US Senate.

Richardson and Leiber won their respective primaries on August 9, 2022.

Republican John Leiber defeated Democrat Aaron Richardson in the general election.

Wyoming

Incumbent Republican Curt Meier is running for re-election. He faced a primary challenge from Bill Gallop. Meier won the primary on August 16.

Notes

References